The Abbazia di Santa Maria delle Macchie (Santa Maria Macularum) was a Roman Catholic Benedictine monastery in a rural hamlet of Macchie, a few kilometers from the town of San Ginesio, in the province of Macerata, region of Marche, Italy.

History
In 1658, Cardinal Giovanni Battista Pallotta promoted restoration of the entire complex: church and monastery. The well-preserved Romanesque-style crypt retains some of the few original elements. The 17th-century Baroque brick facade has a curved pediment roofline, and the facade has eliminated a prior rose window, replaced with four awkward rectangular windows. The original round arch terracotta portal had some spolia fragments of marble friezes and volutes. The church layout now has a single nave. The presbytery is elevated to accommodate the crypt, and the apse has two large chapels.

The crypt is the jewel of the site, with seven naves densely populated by columns and pilasters. The columns have some romanesque capitals with decorative plant and animal motifs, others are ancient Roman ionic capitals and  marble shaft columns.

See also
 Catholic Church in Italy

References

12th-century Roman Catholic church buildings in Italy
17th-century Roman Catholic church buildings in Italy
Baroque architecture in Marche
Benedictine monasteries in Italy
San Ginesio
San Ginesio
Romanesque architecture in le Marche